Glogovac is a village in the municipality of Jagodina, Serbia. According to the 2002 census, the village has a population of 1561 people.

References

External links

Populated places in Pomoravlje District